Electric Dreams is a soundtrack album from the film Electric Dreams, released in 1984.

Overview
Several popular rock and new wave musicians of the 1980s contributed original music to the film's soundtrack. It was available throughout Europe but remained unreleased on compact disc in the U.S. until September 1998.

The song "Together in Electric Dreams" by Philip Oakey and Giorgio Moroder was released as a single and became an international hit in 1984. It was later featured in their album Philip Oakey & Giorgio Moroder (1985). Another song, "Video!" by Jeff Lynne, was also released as a single (with a non-album track, "Sooner or Later", as the B-side).

The soundtrack features two new recordings by Culture Club - "The Dream" and "Love Is Love" - as well as songs performed by Culture Club backing singer Helen Terry ("Now You're Mine") and written by Boy George and Roy Hay ("Electric Dreams", by PP Arnold). All of these were released as singles (except "The Dream") with "Love Is Love" becoming a Top 3 in Canada and Top 10 in Japan in 1985.

Charts

Track listing

Charts

References

Science fiction film soundtracks
Albums produced by Giorgio Moroder
Albums produced by Don Was
Albums produced by Jeff Lynne
Albums produced by Steve Levine
1984 soundtrack albums
Virgin Records soundtracks
Comedy film soundtracks
Epic Records soundtracks